Greenlink is a high-voltage direct current (HVDC) submarine power cable under construction between County Wexford in Ireland and Pembrokeshire in Wales.

Project status
As of May 2022, the project has reached financial close, and construction has started.
 

Offshore construction was scheduled for 2022-23. Trial operation and commissioning is planned for 2024.

Route
The cable will run between EirGrid's Great Island substation in County Wexford, and National Grid's Pembroke substation in Pembrokeshire, with the cable making landfall at Baginbun Beach near Fethard-on-Sea in Ireland and at Freshwater West beach near Castlemartin in Wales. The total length will be , of which  will be under the sea.

Specification
The HVDC link is to be configured as a symmetrical monopole, with DC voltages of ±320kV, and nominal power rating of 500MW. The project is expected to cost €400million.

Project history
Subsea surveys were undertaken in 2018, and public consultations in 2019.

In April 2020, the company submitted three planning applications for onshore construction in Wales. 
The project still required planning permission and marine licences in both the United Kingdom and in Ireland, but the process of procuring construction contracts had started.

In March 2021, the project was granted a licence to install the sea cable in UK waters, with a similar licence for Irish waters still pending. , commissioning of the interconnector was planned for the end of 2023.

In January 2022, construction work on converter stations started.

In March 2022, the company announced that it had reached financial close.

As of September 2022, work had started on the cable route from Great Island to Baginbun with completion of the project now expected in 2024.

See also

 Energy in Ireland
 Energy in the United Kingdom
 Electricity sector in Ireland
 Electricity sector in the United Kingdom
 Celtic Interconnector, cable project to connect Ireland and France

References

External links
 Company website
 Information brochure: October 2021
 Planning and consultation documents

Electrical interconnectors to and from the island of Ireland
Electrical interconnectors to and from Great Britain
HVDC transmission lines
Proposed electric power transmission systems
Electric power infrastructure in the Republic of Ireland
Electric power infrastructure in Wales
Proposed electric power infrastructure in the Republic of Ireland
Proposed electric power infrastructure in Wales